Lion Music is a production company and record label founded in 1989 by composer and artist Lars Eric Mattsson.

History

Lion Music was founded in 1989 by Lars Eric Mattsson as a production company to handle production and licensing for his records in Europe, the United States, and Asia, where a number of deals were signed. After some serious problems with certain labels in the early 90s, Mattsson took a few years off and concentrated on the building of his own studio, as well as a number of other things.

The first releases were Vision's "Till the End of Time" (1997), reissues of Mattsson’s "No Surrender", Vision’s debut album (1998), and Mattsson's solo album Obsession (1998).

In January 2000 Lion Music released Alex Masi's In the Name of Bach and Matsson's Another Dimension.

Branching out

Since this period, Lion Music has operated as a record label with regular releases and seen its roster of artists grow considerably, and they offer varied musical genres and styles. They are a participant in progressive and power metal circles. Lion Music has also branched out into other genres, such AOR/Melodic hard rock, fusion and classic hard rock.

Lion Music has released several tribute albums to Jason Becker, Shawn Lane, Ritchie Blackmore, Jimi Hendrix, Uli Jon Roth, Faraz Anwar, and Gary Moore. Lion Music's current release schedule sees an average of 9 releases per year, including singles, compilations, reissues, and full-length albums.

Lion Music announced that due to ongoing piracy they would stop signing new artists until the problem has been resolved.

Some artists who have signed for Lion Music (physical and digital releases):
Joe McGurk,
Vitalij Kuprij, Luca Di Gennaro,         Luke Fortini,           Alessio Berlaffa,
Tony Cantisano,         Patrick Hemer,          Mathias Holm Klarin,        
B Gera,                Michael Harris,         Dave Martone,  
Milan Polak,           Jonas Hornqvist,        James Byrd.
Joe Stump,              Nicolas Waldo,
Rusty Cooley,           Daniele Liverani,

See also
 List of record labels

External links
Lion Music

Notes

Music production companies
Finnish record labels
Record labels established in 1997
Heavy metal record labels